is an unstaffed railway station in Masuda, Shimane, Japan, operated by West Japan Railway Company (JR West).

Lines
Iinoura Station is served by the Sanin Main Line.

Adjacent stations

History
The station opened on 19 June 1927, initially as a terminus of the Sanin Main Line from Todakohama. From 25 March 1928, the station became a through station following the extension of the line to Susa.

Film location
Iinoura Station was used as the location for the fictional  in the 2006 Japanese film Tabi no Okurimono 0:00 Hatsu.

References

External links
 JR West station information page 

Railway stations in Japan opened in 1927
Railway stations in Shimane Prefecture
Sanin Main Line
Stations of West Japan Railway Company